Barnhill Arena is a 10,000-seat multipurpose arena in Fayetteville, Arkansas, now used primarily for volleyball. The arena opened in 1954 and was home to the University of Arkansas Razorbacks (men's) and Ladybacks (women's) basketball teams before they moved to Bud Walton Arena in 1993. Prior to that, the arena had been considered to be one of the toughest to play in, first in the Southwest Conference and then in the Southeastern Conference, especially when Nolan Richardson was coach; it earned the nickname "Barnhell Arena" because of its rabid student section. After the opening of the new arena, the university converted Barnhill Arena into a volleyball and gymnastics-specific facility, and the Ladybacks' volleyball and gymnastics teams have played there ever since. The arena is also occasionally used for special events, such as concerts, graduations, and speakers.  

It was originally built as the Arkansas Fieldhouse and renamed in 1973 in honor of John Barnhill, the school's former head football coach and athletic director.

Arkansas Razorbacks basketball venues
College gymnastics venues in the United States
College volleyball venues in the United States
Defunct college basketball venues in the United States
Sports venues in Arkansas
Indoor arenas in Arkansas
University of Arkansas buildings
Arkansas Razorbacks gymnastics
University and college buildings completed in 1954
1954 establishments in Arkansas
Sports venues completed in 1954